Craig Sholl (born 30 December 1967) is a former Australian Rules footballer who played for the North Melbourne Kangaroos during the 1990s. He won a premiership with the club in 1996 and the Syd Barker Medal in 1991, which he drew with Mick Martyn.

Sholl played his 200th game for the Kangaroos in the 1998 Grand Final which they lost to the Adelaide Crows.

Sholl would once again taste premiership glory in the 1999 Grand Final against Carlton, kicking an early goal and assisting another.

His final game was the 2000 preliminary final against Melbourne in which he finished on a high note, kicking seven goals.

Playing statistics

|- style="background-color: #EAEAEA"
! scope="row" style="text-align:center" | 1987
|style="text-align:center;"|
| 51 || 4 || 0 || 1 || 26 || 13 || 39 || 8 || 4 || 0.0 || 0.3 || 6.5 || 3.3 || 9.8 || 2.0 || 1.0
|-
! scope="row" style="text-align:center" | 1988
|style="text-align:center;"|
| 51 || 0 || — || — || — || — || — || — || — || — || — || — || — || — || — || —
|- style="background:#eaeaea;"
! scope="row" style="text-align:center" | 1989
|style="text-align:center;"|
| 41 || 4 || 0 || 1 || 26 || 13 || 39 || 8 || 4 || 0.0 || 0.3 || 6.5 || 3.3 || 9.8 || 2.0 || 1.0
|-
! scope="row" style="text-align:center" | 1990
|style="text-align:center;"|
| 24 || 13 || 4 || 3 || 165 || 52 || 217 || 33 || 33 || 0.3 || 0.2 || 12.7 || 4.0 || 16.7 || 2.5 || 2.5
|- style="background:#eaeaea;"
! scope="row" style="text-align:center" | 1991
|style="text-align:center;"|
| 24 || 22 || 4 || 5 || 275 || 116 || 391 || 86 || 46 || 0.2 || 0.2 || 12.5 || 5.3 || 17.8 || 3.9 || 2.1
|-
! scope="row" style="text-align:center" | 1992
|style="text-align:center;"|
| 24 || 21 || 4 || 2 || 278 || 144 || 422 || 69 || 45 || 0.2 || 0.1 || 13.2 || 6.9 || 20.1 || 3.3 || 2.1
|- style="background:#eaeaea;"
! scope="row" style="text-align:center" | 1993
|style="text-align:center;"|
| 24 || 21 || 4 || 8 || 243 || 95 || 338 || 58 || 34 || 0.2 || 0.4 || 11.6 || 4.5 || 16.1 || 2.8 || 1.6
|-
! scope="row" style="text-align:center" | 1994
|style="text-align:center;"|
| 24 || 24 || 4 || 6 || 290 || 109 || 399 || 84 || 32 || 0.2 || 0.3 || 12.1 || 4.5 || 16.6 || 3.5 || 1.3
|- style="background:#eaeaea;"
! scope="row" style="text-align:center" | 1995
|style="text-align:center;"|
| 24 || 19 || 1 || 3 || 163 || 80 || 243 || 37 || 15 || 0.1 || 0.2 || 8.6 || 4.2 || 12.8 || 1.9 || 0.8
|-
! scope="row" style="text-align:center" | 1996
|style="text-align:center;"|
| 24 || 23 || 35 || 23 || 223 || 109 || 332 || 84 || 48 || 1.5 || 1.0 || 9.7 || 4.7 || 14.4 || 3.7 || 2.1
|- style="background:#eaeaea;"
! scope="row" style="text-align:center" | 1997
|style="text-align:center;"|
| 24 || 25 || 40 || 34 || 201 || 113 || 314 || 122 || 40 || 1.6 || 1.4 || 8.0 || 4.5 || 12.6 || 4.9 || 1.6
|-
! scope="row" style="text-align:center" | 1998
|style="text-align:center;"|
| 24 || 24 || 24 || 28 || 182 || 84 || 266 || 76 || 53 || 1.0 || 1.2 || 7.6 || 3.5 || 11.1 || 3.2 || 2.2
|- style="background:#eaeaea;"
! scope="row" style="text-align:center" | 1999
|style="text-align:center;"|
| 24 || 22 || 30 || 15 || 159 || 68 || 227 || 70 || 29 || 1.4 || 0.7 || 7.2 || 3.1 || 10.3 || 3.2 || 1.3
|-
! scope="row" style="text-align:center" | 2000
|style="text-align:center;"|
| 24 || 13 || 15 || 13 || 67 || 30 || 97 || 37 || 15 || 1.2 || 1.0 || 5.2 || 2.3 || 7.5 || 2.8 || 1.2
|- class="sortbottom"
! colspan=3| Career
! 235
! 165
! 142
! 2298
! 1026
! 3324
! 772
! 398
! 0.7
! 0.6
! 9.8
! 4.4
! 14.1
! 3.3
! 1.7
|}

References

External links

1967 births
Living people
North Melbourne Football Club players
North Melbourne Football Club Premiership players
Syd Barker Medal winners
Australian rules footballers from Victoria (Australia)
Echuca Football Club players
Victorian State of Origin players
Two-time VFL/AFL Premiership players